Frontiers Music – formerly Frontiers Records – is an Italian record label, predominantly producing hard rock. It was founded in 1996 by Serafino Perugino and is based in Naples.

History
In 1996, Serafino Perugino started working in the music industry as an Italian distributor for numerous artists in the field of classic rock and earned an excellent reputation in the field. In 1998, that reputation gave him the credentials to start Frontiers Records. The first release of the new label was the double live album Never Say Goodbye by the British hard rock group Ten.

In addition to the commitment of Frontiers Records to manage new artists in the genre the label has become a premier label in the classic rock nostalgia circuit with a roster that includes several well known classic rock bands and artists, such as Little River Band, Jeff Lynne, Winger, Styx, Toto, Yes, Joe Lynn Turner, Journey, Thunder, Survivor, Glenn Hughes, House of Lords, Crush 40, Hardline, Jeff Scott Soto, Whitesnake, Boston and FM

In December 2010, Frontiers Records completed a sales contract with EMI Music for the U.S. and Canada distribution, which became effective from January 2011. After Universal Music Group (UMG)'s purchase of EMI, Caroline, a UMG company, has undertaken US distribution. From January 2017, Sony Music or its independent labels distributor RED Music has started to distribute Frontiers Records releases in some key markets such as US, Canada, Australia and New Zealand. Caroline Distribution (now Virgin Music Label & Artist Services) has been continuing the distribution in UK while in the other parts of the world, the independent labels distribute Frontiers Records releases. The exclusive distribution in Greece is being carried out by Infinity Entertainment IKE.

Italian producer, singer, keyboardist, songwriter, and mixing engineer Alessandro Del Vecchio works as the in-house producer for the label.

In 2018, the label added multi-platinum recording artist Quiet Riot to its roster of artists.

It is unclear at exactly what time Frontiers Records renamed itself to Frontiers Music but some speculate that this occurred in 2014.

Artists

7 Months
About Us
Action
Airrace
Alan Parsons
Allen/Lande
Ambition
American Tears
Ammunition
Animal Drive
Anette Olzon
Asia
Auras
Avalon
Bad Habit
Bad Moon Rising
Balance
Bailey
Beggars & Thieves
Benedictum
Beyond The Bridge
Bigfoot
Billy Sherwood
Black 'n Blue
Blackwood Creek
Blanc Faces
Blood Red Saints
Blue Öyster Cult
Bonrud
Bowes & Morley
Bob Catley
Boston
Bourgeois Pigs
Brazen Abbot
Brian Howe
Bruce Kulick
Burning Rain
Cain's Offering
Cinderella
Circus Maximus
The Codex
Constancia
Cosmo
Crashdïet
Crash The System
Crazy Lixx
Creye
Crown of Thorns
Crush 40
Danger Danger
Daniele Liverani
Danny Vaughn
Dario Mollo / Tony Martin
Dark Lunacy
David Readman
Def Leppard (EU)
The Defiants
De La Cruz
Diamond Dawn
Dokken
Dream Child
Dukes of the Orient
Eclipse
Edge of Paradise
Emerald Rain
Empty Tremor
The End Machine
Enuff Z'nuff
Evil Masquerade
Extreme
Fair Warning
False Memories
First Signal
FM
Forty Deuce
Frederiksen / Denander
From the Inside (Danny Vaughn)
Furyon
Genius
Gene The Werewolf
Giant
Girlschool
Giuntini Project
Glenn Hughes
Great White
Hardline
Harem Scarem
Hell In The Club
Hess
Honeymoon Suite
House of Lords
Howard Leese
Hurtsmile
Icon Of Sin
Iconic
Impellitteri
Infinite & Divine
Inglorious
Issa
Jack Blades
Jack Russell's Great White
Jaded Heart
Jaime Kyle
James Christian
Jean Beauvoir
Jeff Lynne
Jeff Scott Soto (JSS)
Jim Peterik
Jimi Jamison
Joe Lynn Turner
John Elefante
 John Shadowinds
John Waite
John West
John Wetton
Jorn
Journey (EU)
Keel
Kee of Hearts
Kelly Keagy
Kent Hilli
Khymera
King Kobra
Kingdom Come
Kip Winger
Kiske/Somerville
KXM
L.A. Guns
Labyrinth
Lana Lane
Lenna Kuurmaa
Level 10
Lords of Black
Leverage
Lionsheart
Little River Band
Lords of Black
Los Angeles
Lou Gramm Band (EU)
Lunatica
Lynch Mob
The Magnificent
Magnus Karlsson's Free Fall
Mastedon
Mecca
Meldrum
Melodica
Mercury X
The Mercury Train
Michael Kiske
Michael Sembello
Michael Thompson Band
Mike Tramp
Millenium
Mind Key
The Mob
Mollo Martin
Mr. Big
The Murder of My Sweet
Neal Morse
Nelson
Night Ranger
Nordic Union
Norway
Novena
Oliver Hartmann
On the Rise
One Desire
Operation: Mindcrime
Outloud
Palace
Pathosray
Perfect Plan
Phantom V
Philip Bardowell
Pink Cream 69
Place Vendome
Places of Power
Platens
Player
The Poodles
Praying Mantis
Pretty Maids
Pride of Lions
Primal Fear
Prime Suspect
Prime Time
Q5
RavenEye
Rated X
Resurrection Kings
Revertigo
Revolution Saints
Richard Marx
Richie Kotzen
Rick Springfield
Ring of Fire
Rising Steel
Robin Beck
Royal Hunt
Saint Deamon
Scheepers
Sebastian Bach
Seventh Key
Seventh Wonder
Seven Spires
Seven Tears
Sculptor
Shark Island
Shooting Star
Silent Rage
Silent Force
Skin Tag
Slav Simanic
Sonic Station
Soul Doctor
Soul SirkUS
Spin Gallery
Spread Eagle
Stan Bush
Starbreaker
Steelheart
Steve Lukather
Strangeways
Street Legal
Stryper
Styx
Sweet & Lynch
Sunstorm
Survivor
Tak Matsumoto Group
Talisman
Tall Stories
Ted Nugent
Ted Poley
Ten
Terra Nova
Terry Brock
Tesla
The Dark Element
Thunder
Timo Tolkki
TNT
Tokyo Motor Fist
Tommy Funderburk
Tony Harnell & The Mercury Train
Tony O'Hora
Toto
Touch
Treat
Triumph
Trillium
Trixter
The Trophy
Tyketto
Two Fires
Unruly Child
Uriah Heep
Valentine
Vanden Plas
VEGA
Vertigo
Vince Neil
Vision Divine
Vixen
Voodoo Circle
Voodoo Hill
Warrant
Wayward Sons
W.E.T.
Wetton/Downes
White Lion
White Skull
Whitesnake
Wig Wam
Winger
Work of Art
World Trade
X-Drive
Xorigin
Y&T
Yes
Yoso
Zion

References

External links
Frontiers Music home page

Italian independent record labels
Companies based in Naples
Record labels established in 1996
Italian companies established in 1996
Rock record labels
Heavy metal record labels